Parmena novaki is a species of beetle in the family Cerambycidae. It was described by Sama in 1997. It is known from Greece.

References

Parmenini
Beetles described in 1997